The "Prayer of a Midshipman" was written by William Nathaniel Thomas in 1938. Thomas (1892-1979) was the Chief of Chaplains of the United States Navy. He wrote the "Prayer of a Midshipman" at the request of the midshipmen while Command Chaplain at the United States Naval Academy, Annapolis, Maryland. It is said to encompass much of his theology and his ideal of a Naval Officer." He never sought credit for the prayer. There is an original version and an ungendered interfaith version. The prayer has been used at Divine Services at the US Naval Academy Chapel ever since 1938. A bronze plaque of the prayer resides in the chapel.
During Plebe summer 2013 the US Naval Academy Chaplain Center conducted a Midshipman Prayer Sermon Series.  “Each Sunday during the Plebe Summer of 2013, the preacher for that week addressed one of the petitions of the Midshipman Prayer. The scripture readings were specially selected to complement and expand on the petition rather than follow the traditional Revised Common Lectionary.”

Midshipman Prayer 1938

Midshipman Prayer Interfaith Version

Criticism 
The Constitution establishes that there are no religious tests for office, and that the government may not make an establishment of religion. While mandatory chapel attendance at the Naval Academy ended in the 1970s, mandatory, 100% Christian noon meal prayer continues every day, and religious tracts with the Midshipman Prayer on them are passed out by uniformed Naval officers at secular USNA events. Noon meal prayer has been discontinued at USMA and USAFA. The oath of office taken by midshipmen and officers may be affirmed and is to "support and defend the Constitution," not to serve the "almighty god / thee" specified in the prayer. 

While USNA claims the Midshipman Prayer is "interfaith," the text is specific to a monotheistic abrahamic religion. Members of other traditions at USNA, such as polytheists, members of dharmic religions, atheists, freethinkers, secularists, humanists, and a small group of satanist midshipmen, are excluded. USNA so far has declined to adopt more inclusive prayers and has had exclusively Christian noon meal prayer for several years. A proposed inclusive midshipman prayer is

References 

Christian prayer